Sadanand Chauhan was an Indian politician and member of the Lok Janshakti Party. Chauhan was a member of the Himachal Pradesh Legislative Assembly from the Nahan constituency in Sirmaur district.

References

People from Sirmaur district
Lok Janshakti Party politicians
Himachal Pradesh MLAs 2003–2007
Living people
21st-century Indian politicians
Year of birth missing (living people)